is a passenger railway station located in Sakai-ku, Sakai, Osaka Prefecture, Japan, operated by the private railway operator Nankai Electric Railway.It has the station number "NK12".

Lines

Layout
The station consists of one elevated island platform with the station building underneath.

Platforms

Adjacent stations

History
Minato Station opened on 1 October 1897.

Passenger statistics
In fiscal 2019, the station was used by an average of 6704 passengers daily.

Surrounding area
Sakai Dejima Fishing Port
Sakai Dejima Yacht Harbor
Sakai City Ohama Junior High School

See also
 List of railway stations in Japan

References

External links

  

Railway stations in Japan opened in 1897
Railway stations in Osaka Prefecture
Sakai, Osaka